Staphylococcus lutrae is a species of Gram-positive bacteria and a member of the genus Staphylococcus. Strains of this species were originally isolated from otters and are coagulase-positive.

References

External links
 Type strain of Staphylococcus lutrae at BacDive -  the Bacterial Diversity Metadatabase

Gram-positive bacteria
lutrae
Bacteria described in 1997